For previous namesake see USS Bear (1874)

USCGC Bear (WMEC-901) is a United States Coast Guard medium endurance cutter. She was laid down August 23, 1979 and launched September 25, 1980 by the Tacoma Boatbuilding Company of Tacoma, Washington. She was commissioned February 4, 1983. She was named for  USRC Bear (AG-29), a steam barquentine that was built in Scotland and served the United States Treasury Department in the United States Revenue Cutter Service's Alaskan Patrol.

History 

In 1986, Bear responded to the Space Shuttle Challenger disaster by searching over 1900 square nautical miles (6,500 km²). During any given patrol, Bear conducts a wide-spectrum of missions such as search and rescue, alien migrant interdiction operations, counter-drug patrols, fisheries enforcement, and international engagement—illustrating the versatile, multi-mission character of the Coast Guard and the cutter fleet. Since her commissioning she has made 18 significant drug seizures involving 12 marijuana and 6 cocaine busts.

In 1999 the Bear was deployed with the USS Theodore Roosevelt (CVN-71) Battle Group to support NATO combat operations during Operation Allied Force. During this the Bear performed various mission such as surface surveillance, provided backup Search and Rescue response, combat escort for US Army transport vessels in areas where the cutter was well within range of enemy missiles, and provided force protection for the Amphibious Ready Group operating near Albania. Vice Admiral Murphy stated how well and how seamlessly the Bear and her crew performed naval operations. This was due to the Bear's interoperability, crew training and knowledge in naval warfare and naval war fighting doctrine, and adequate weaponry. The Bear was awarded the Kosovo Campaign Medal and the NATO Kosovo Medal. As of 2019, CGC Bear has been deployed 65 times since launch.

Notes

External links
 
Bear home page

1980 ships
Famous-class cutters
Ships built by Tacoma Boatbuilding Company
Ships of the United States Coast Guard